Heide (Holsatian: Heid) is a town in Schleswig-Holstein, Germany. It is the capital of the Kreis (district) Dithmarschen. Population: 21,000.

The German word Heide means "heath". In the 15th century four adjoining villages decided to build a church in the "middle of the heath". This remained the town's name to date. The exact foundation date is now unknown, but by 1447 Heide was already the main village of Dithmarschen. At this time Dithmarschen was an independent peasant republic. Heide became a town in the 19th century.

Heide has the largest un-built-upon market square in Germany, with 4.7 hectares. It is used primarily as a parking lot and has approximately 500 parking spaces. In 2016, the city staged 3 car-free Sundays on the market square for the first time.

Sport
The association soccer club Heider SV plays in the Oberliga Schleswig-Holstein (V).

Notable landmarks
 St. Jürgen church (1560)
 Water tower (1903)
 Museum of Dithmarschen History
 Brahmshaus, dwelling house of the ancestors of the composer Johannes Brahms, now a museum

Notable people

 Johannes Brahms (1833-1897), composer
 Rudolph Dirks (1877–1968), comic-strip artist
 Alfred Dührssen (1862–1933), gynecologist and obstetrician
 Willi Gerdau (1929–2011), international footballer
 Klaus Groth (1819–1899), a Low German poet
 Julian Grundt (born 1988), former footballer
 Carl-Heinz Rodenberg (1904–1995), neurologist and psychiatrist, proficient in the murder of mental patients by the Nazis
 Fritz Thiedemann (1918–2000), equestrian

International relations

There is a twinning between Kreis Dithmarschen and Restormel Borough Council.
 Restormel, England, United Kingdom
 Nowogard, Poland
 Anklam, Germany

Gallery

References

External links

 

Dithmarschen